Maud Fontenoy (born September 7, 1977) is a French sailor known for her rowings across the Atlantic (2003) and Pacific (2005) oceans.

Most recently, she completed a sailing trip around the Antarctic alone, against prevailing winds.

Fontenoy was named the UNESCO’s Intergovernmental Oceanographic Commission and the World Ocean Network Spokesperson for the Ocean on 3 June 2009

Maud Fontenoy has four children: Mahé (with Thomas Vollaire), Hina (with an unknown man), Loup (with Raphaël Enthoven), and Côme (with Olivier Chartier).

Distinctions
 : National Order of Merit (12 July 2007)

Notes

References

External links 
 Official website
 Maud Fontenoy Fondation, programmes pédagogiques sur les Océans et éducation à l'environnement
 Éducation à l'environnement

French sailors
Female sailors
1977 births
Living people
Recipients of the Legion of Honour
Knights of the Ordre national du Mérite